Rosauro Reyes Salvador (October 7, 1945 – November 16, 2007), known professionally as Ross Rival, was a former actor and father of JonJon Hernandez, Joseph Salvador, Rosauro Luis G. Salavador, Luchi Salvador-Joson, Sahara Shyla G. Salvador and Maja Salvador.

His mother, Carmen Salvador, was a Spanish Filipina of German descent, and his father, Luis "Lou" Salvador was a Spanish Filipino. Lou Salvador was a famous basketball player, stage actor and talent manager.

Early life
Born Rosauro Reyes Salvador on October 7, 1945, in Quezon City. His father was Lou Salvador and is a brother of actor Phillip Salvador, the late director Leroy Salvador, actors Lou Salvador Jr., Alona Alegre, Mina Aragon, Jumbo Salvador and uncle to actors Deborah Sun and Jobelle Salvador.

Personal life

He was the father to JonJon Hernandez, Joseph Salvador, Rosauro Luis G. Salvador, Luchie Salvador-Joson, Sahara Shyla G. Salvador and Maja Salvador.

Death

He died on November 16, 2007, in Quezon City, due to prostate cancer. His remains were cremated on November 20, 2007.

Filmography

Movies

Miscellaneous crew

References

1945 births
2007 deaths
People from Quezon City
Male actors from Metro Manila
Ross
20th-century Filipino male actors
Filipino male child actors
Filipino male film actors
Deaths from cancer in the Philippines
Deaths from prostate cancer